The cycling competition at the 1932 Summer Olympics in Los Angeles consisted of two road cycling events and four track cycling events. The program of events was unchanged from the previous Games.

Medal summary

Road cycling

Track cycling

Participating nations
66 cyclists from 13 nations competed.

Medal table

References

 
1932 Summer Olympics events
1932
1932 in road cycling
1932 in track cycling
1932 in cycle racing